Kenneth W. Warren is an American academic and author. He is a professor of English at the University of Chicago. He is a scholar of American and African American literature from the late 19th century to the middle 20th century.

Publications

Books
What Was African American Literature? (Harvard, 2010)
So Black and Blue: Ralph Ellison and the Occasion of Criticism (Chicago, 2003)
Black and White Strangers: Race and American Literary Realism (Chicago, 1993)

Editor
Renewing Black Intellectual History: The Material and Ideological Foundations of African America Thought (Paradigm, 2010)
Jim Crow, Literature, and the Legacy of Sutton E. Griggs (Georgia, 2013)

References

University of Chicago faculty
Living people
Year of birth missing (living people)
21st-century American male writers
Black studies scholars